TVB Music Group (Traditional Chinese: 星夢娛樂集團有限公司), formerly known as The Voice Entertainment Group Ltd, is a Hong Kong record label, talent agency, and publisher of pop music, founded by TVB and Stars Shine International in 2013. The label was established to promote and distribute TVB soundtracks, as well to cultivate singers who have competed on TVB's The Voice and The Voice of the Stars singing competitions. Artists signed to Voice Entertainment are Fred Cheng, Jinny Ng, Kayee Tam, Hana Kuk, Alvin Ng, Vivian Koo, Joey Thye,  & Shiga Lin.

As of April 2022, Voice Entertainment changed its name to TVB Music Group (TMG).

Current recording artists 

 Alvin Ng
 Brian Tse
 Fred Cheng
 James Ng
 Hana Kuk
 Jinny Ng
 Joey Thye
 JW
 Kayee Tam
 Shiga Lin
 Venus Wong
 Vivian Koo

Former recording artists 

 Ally Tse
 Alfred Hui
 Austin Lam
 Bella Lam
 Grace Wong
 Hoffman Cheng
 Hubert Wu
 Johnny Ku
 Linda Chung
 Pakho Chau
 Rowland Law
 Stephanie Ho
 Yao Bin
 Zac Liu

TVB themesongs

Parent companies 
 TVB
 TVB Music Limited

References 

Pop record labels
Hong Kong record labels
Record labels established in 2013